Dimnus of Chalastra in Macedonia was hetairos of Alexander. In autumn 330 BC, he formed a conspiracy to murder the king. Dimnus revealed to his eromenos Nicomachus  the names of the conspirators (Demetrius, Peucolaus, Nicanor, Aphobetus, lolaus, Dioxenus, Archepolis, Amyntas). But the plot was divulged by Cebalinus, who learned of the details from his brother, Nicomachus.

References
Who's who in the age of Alexander the Great: prosopography of Alexander's empire  by Waldemar Heckel 

Generals of Alexander the Great
Ancient Macedonian generals
Conspirators against Alexander the Great
Ancient Mygdonia
Lower Macedonians